Kumar Bajitpur is a village located in the Vaishali district of Bihar, East India.

Demographics
As per 2011 census Kumar Bajitpur city has a population of 15,540, out of which males were 7,845 and females were 7,695. The literacy rate was 79.26 per cent, higher than the national average of 74.04%: male literacy is 84.78%, and female literacy is 72.93%. In Kumar Bajitpur, 16% of the population is under 6 years of age.. The sex ratio of 873 females per 1,000 males was lower than the national average of 944.

Climate

References 

Cities and towns in Vaishali district